Becky is a 1927 American silent comedy film directed by John P. McCarthy starring Sally O'Neil and Owen Moore.

Synopsis
Rebecca (Sally O'Neil) is a salesgirl who gets a chance at a Broadway show; there, she attracts and is ultimately rejected by a society playboy.

Cast
 Sally O'Neil as Rebecca O'Brien McCloskey
 Owen Moore as Dan Scarlett
 Harry Crocker as John Carroll Estabrook
 Gertrude Olmstead as Nan Estabrook
 Mack Swain as Irving Spiegelberg
 Claude King as Boris Abelard
 Caroline Dine as Young girl

References

External links

Lantern slide; George Eastman House(Wayback)
Still at silentera.com
Still at alamy.com
Still #1 and #2 at granger.com

1927 films
Metro-Goldwyn-Mayer films
American silent feature films
American black-and-white films
1927 comedy films
Silent American comedy films
Films directed by John P. McCarthy
1920s American films